Miraka may refer to:

 Miraka Szászy, prominent Māori leader
 Festim Miraka, Albanian professional footballer

See also 
 Mirak (disambiguation)